BBN Music is a digital music distribution company founded in January 2002. It is a wholly owned subsidiary of BBN Holding. BBN Music delivers music from independent record labels and musicians to online retailers such as Spotify, iTunes, Apple Music, Napster, Deezer, Pandora, Amazon Music, and Beatport.

History
Originally begun under the name Fortissimo Records, the record label was formed in 2002, arranging gigs at Bletchley Youth Club, in Milton Keynes. They then moved to releasing CDs and LPs by bands from the Milton Keynes area, having now 10 releases, and arranging gigs for touring bands from the UK and the United States.

In 2009 the label released the album Patterns of the Boston noise band Neptune. In 2010, Fortissimo has released a vinyl re-issue of Glenn Branca's 1981 album The Ascension and the first solo album Mate of former Action Beat member Peter James Taylor. In 2011, Fortissimo released the album 'the Last Minute' by Hired Muscle.

In 2021 the company was acquired by BBN Holding. Fortissimo Records was rebranded under the name BBN Music to form a new company branch.

Notable Artists
 Action Beat
 Alien Father
 Ayesha Erotica
 Glenn Branca
 Dark Hadou
 Dawn Chorus
 Evi Ryu vs. the Lost Maji
 Hired Muscle
 Paul Grant (AKA 'the Vet')
 Madrid Axemen
 Neptune
 Riotmen
 Peter James Taylor
 The Coyote Sisters
 Pezzarahtha Webbarahta
 Jahsh Banks

See also

 List of record labels

References

External links
 BBN Music

British independent record labels
Companies based in San Francisco
Entertainment companies based in California
Entertainment companies established in 2002
Record label distributors
Record labels established in 2002
Recording Industry Association of America
2002 establishments in England